Vučkovica is a village located in the municipality of Lučani, southwestern Serbia. According to the 2011 census, the village has a population of 326 inhabitants. There is an artificial lake "Goli Kamen" located in the village; it was built in 1990 and covers an area of 7.6 hectares.

References

Populated places in Moravica District